"Mirotic" (Korean: 주문, Jumun; Japanese: 呪文, Jumon, lit. "Magic Spell") is a song by South Korean boy band TVXQ. It was released in South Korea via SM Entertainment as part of the group's eponymous fourth studio album on September 26, 2008. In Japan, it was released as a CD single titled "Jumon: Mirotic" through Rhythm Zone on October 15, 2008, where it served as one of the several lead singles for the group's fourth Japanese studio album Secret Code (2009). The Korean lyrics was written by Yoo Young-jin, with Japanese lyrics translated by Ryoji Sonoda, whilst music was handled by Yoo, Mikkel Sigvardt, Lucas Secon and Thomas Troelsen. The song was based from Sarah Connor's single Under My Skin.

Retrospectively, "Mirotic" garnered praise from music critics and was named one of the best boy band songs of all time by Billboard and Rolling Stone. It was met with commercial success in both countries upon its release; in Japan, it became the group's fourth single to reach number one on the Oricon Singles Chart and was certified gold in both digital sales and physical shipments by the RIAJ. It has reportedly received over 4,100,000 digital downloads in South Korea, making it the group's most downloaded single in the country. Two accompanying music videos were made available in support of the single's release in both regions.

Background and release
"Mirotic" was released as the title track for the group's fourth studio album of the same name on September 26, 2008, via SM Entertainment. In Japan, the single "Jumon: Mirotic" was released via Avex Trax's subsidiary label Rhythm Zone on October 15, 2008. It was physically distributed in three versions: a standard CD, a fanclub special edition CD and a limited edition CD + DVD bundle. The release includes the instrumental version of the song along with a remixed version of "Dōshite Kimi o Suki ni Natte Shimattandarō".

On October 16, 2008, a fanclub event titled "Mirotic Party" was held to commemorate the release of the single. It was held at a club in Tokyo and was limited to only members of Tohoshinki's official fanclub.

Reception
"Mirotic" experienced commercial success in both South Korea in Japan. The track has reportedly garnered 4,173,225 downloads in South Korea, making it the group's best-selling single in the country. In the first week of its release in Japan, it recorded sales of 71,000 copies and achieved top position on the weekly Oricon singles ranking in the chart issue dated October 27, 2008, becoming their fourth number-one single. It was certified gold by the Recording Industry Association of Japan (RIAJ) for physical shipments of over 100,000 units in December 2008 and for digital downloads in July 2014. On the Billboard Japan Hot 100, "Jumon: Mirotic" peaked at number seven in the week of October 22, 2008.

Music video
The music video was filmed on the end of August 2008 nearby Seoul, South Korea by Cho Soo-hyun (조수현) and premiered on September 21, 2008, after five days the teaser released. Later, it was premiered the Japanese version on September 27, 2008, with the alternate clips of the original video. There are also other versions of the video: the dance version and the solo versions of the members. 

The music video features all the members walking when they are pulled by a sorceress in red and white. They are then shown in different scenarios, whereas: Hero Jaejoong is tied with rope handcuffs on a wall, U-Know Yunho is bound by ribbons around his wrists, Micky Yoochun is encased in glass, Xiah Junsu is trapped in lasers and Max Changmin is in water. There is also a dance scene in a room with a huge round light at the ceiling's center. In the end of the video, the members managed to break and escape their bindings and chase the sorceress who lost her power. The sorceress in turn attempts to escape as she slowly melts and then fades away as they slowly approach her. The eyes of the members start glowing whitish-green at the end of the music video.

Track listing
Japanese CD single
 
  
 

Japanese DVD tracklist

"Off Shot Movie"

Credits and personnel

Studio
 Recorded, mixed, engineered for mix and digitally edited at SM Booming System
 Mastered at Sonic Korea

Crew
 SM Entertainment – executive producer
 Lee Soo-man – producer
 TVXQ – vocals, background vocals
 Yoo Young-jin – producer, Korean lyrics, composition, arrangement, vocal director, background vocals, recording, mixing, digital editing, music and sound supervisor
 Ryoji Sonada – Japanese lyrics 
 Remee – composition
 Lucas Secon – composition
 Thomas Troelsen – composition, synthesizer, programming
 Jeon Hoon  – mastering

Accolades

Charts

Weekly charts

Year-end charts

Sales and certifications

Release history

See also
 List of best-selling singles in South Korea

References

External links
 https://web.archive.org/web/20080409203505/http://toho-jp.net/index.html

2008 singles
2008 songs
TVXQ songs
Chinese-language songs
Korean-language songs
Japanese-language songs
Songs written by Lucas Secon
Songs written by Remee
Songs written by Thomas Troelsen
Songs written by Yoo Young-jin
Rhythm Zone singles
SM Entertainment singles
Oricon Weekly number-one singles
Music controversies